"Godfather Death" (German: Der Gevatter Tod) is a German fairy tale collected by the Brothers Grimm and first published in 1812 (KHM 44). It is a tale of Aarne-Thompson type 332.

Origin 
The tale was published by the Brothers Grimm in the first edition of Kinder- und Hausmärchen in 1812, as tale no. 44.

Synopsis
A poor man has twelve children and works hard to feed each of them every day. When his thirteenth and last child is born, the man decides to find a godfather for this child. He runs out into the highway and finds God walking there. God asks to be the godfather, promising the child health and happiness. The man, after finding out that the man is God, declines, saying that God condones poverty. Then the man meets the Devil on the highway. The Devil asks to be the godfather, offering the child gold and the world's joys. The man, after finding out that the man is the Devil, declines, saying that the Devil deceives mankind.

The man, still walking down the highway, meets Death. The man decides to make Death the child's godfather saying that Death takes away the rich and the poor, without discrimination. The next Sunday, Death becomes the child's godfather.

When the boy comes of age, Death appears to him and leads him into the woods, where special herbs grow. There, the boy is promised that Death will make him a famous physician. It is explained that whenever the boy visits an ill person, Death will appear next to the sick person. If Death stands at the person's head, that person is to be given the special herb found in the forest and cured. But if Death appears at the person's feet, any treatment on them would be useless as they would soon die.

The boy soon becomes famous, just as Death had foreseen, and receives plenty of gold for his amazing ability to see whether a person would live or die. Soon, the king of all the lands becomes ill and sends for the famous physician.

When the physician goes to see the king, he notices immediately that Death is standing at the foot of the bed. The physician feels pity for the king and decides to trick Death. The physician turns the king around in his bed so that Death stands over the head. He then gives the king the herb to eat. This heals the king and speeds his recovery.

Soon after, Death approaches the physician, expressing anger for tricking him and disobeying Death's rules. But because the physician is Death's godchild, he does not punish him. Death then warns the physician that if he was to ever trick Death again, he will take the physician's life.

Not much later, the king's daughter becomes ill and the physician goes to see her. The king promises his daughter's hand in marriage and the inheritance of the crown if the physician cures her. When the physician visits the princess, he sees Death at her feet. Ignoring this, he is captivated by the princess's beauty and thoughts of being her husband. The physician turns the princess around so that Death is at her head. He then feeds her the herb.

Just as the princess is coming around, Death grasps the physician by the arm and drags him to a cavern. In this cave are thousands of candles, each burned down to different lengths. Death explains that the length of each candle shows how much longer a person has to live. Death shows the physician his candle and it is very short, suggesting that the physician doesn't have much longer to live.

The physician pleads with his godfather to light him a new candle, so that he may live a happy life as king and husband to the beautiful princess. The physician walks to the candle of his child and tries to move it to his own.

Death says he cannot: in order for another to be lit, one has to go out. The physician begs that he takes out one candle and lights a new one. Death obeys. He walks towards the physician's candle and looks at it.

Just as he is about to light the new candle, Death lifts his scythe and the boy's candle goes out. As soon as the candle is extinguished, the physician falls dead to the ground.

Other versions
This story was included in the first edition of Kinder- und Hausmärchen, but the first edition version included a different ending. The first edition version ended at the part of Death showing the physician the candles. The second edition version of Kinder- und Hausmärchen included the part of Death pretending to light the candle and failing on purpose, killing the physician.

Variants 
The "Godfather Death" tale is similar to other AT-332 tales, such as the Austrian "Dr. Urssenbeck, Physician of Death", the Norwegian "The Boy with the Ale Keg", or the Italian "The Just Man".

Scholarship suggests that a predecessor of the tale type is attested in an Icelandic manuscript from 1339, probably based on a yet unknown Latin source.

Other media

 Grimm's Fairy Tale Classics adapted the story for one of its episodes, with a few alterations. The greedy man refuses because God traditionally rewards souls in Heaven, while the man wants his son to be rich; it then cuts to Death. Another difference is the end: the young protagonist is more heroic than in the original, is disgusted with the tricks from the start and at the end he sacrifices himself to save the princess (who is still a child), delaying Death and allowing her to get better. Death is also shocked and griefstricken when the young man explains his reasons to give his life in exchange for the princess' own.
 The Storyteller featured an episode heavily inspired by this story called "The Soldier and Death." In this telling the man isn't Death's godson, but has the same trick of healing people if death is at their head and being unable if at their feet. Another difference is that he traps Death in a sack when he sees him at his own feet. The ending also differs, where he ends up becoming an endless wanderer due to being feared by Death, feared by hell and refused in heaven.
 Anne Sexton wrote an adaptation as a poem called "Godfather Death" in her collection Transformations (1971), a book in which she re-envisions sixteen of the Grimm's Fairy tales.
 A similar story exists in some cultures and countries, such as Mexico and Lithuania, where Death is portrayed as female, becoming the child's godmother instead of his godfather. In at least the Mexican variant of this story, Death's godson does not come to her because it is nearing his time to die and is allowed to die, but when he falls in love with a woman, his godmother tries to warn him away from her. When he insists she explain why, she takes him to her cave in which the candles that represent all of the lives of all of humanity burn, and shows him that the candle that represents his lover's life is much shorter than his. While at first he insist it will not matter to him, when her time comes, he betrays his promise and uses the magical powers Death gave him to extend her life. In a rage, Death comes to punish him, but instead shows him a cruel sort of mercy. She blows out both her godson's candle and that of his lover, so they die at exactly the same instant.
 Another Mexican take on the story is The Third Guest of B. Traven where there is no godson but instead a woodcutter who refuses to share his food with God and the Devil but shares it with the Death instead. After going through similar situations as the godson of the original story he has his life and honor spared by Death himself. In the movie version called Macario (1960), the story ends with the death of the starring character.
 In a Polish variant of the tale, called "Three Lamps" a boy rescues Death (a female) from a swamp, and in gratitude, she teaches him healing arts. In this variant, a person is doomed if the Death stands near his head. The healer turns three people to save them; his own mother, a poor widow with many children, and a hero who is the only hope of his people in a desperate war. After the third case, Death shows him the cave with the fires of human lives - in this tale, oil lamps - and states that his own oil has run out; the only way for him to save himself being to pour into his lamp the oil of the three people he took from her. The doctor refuses and dies on the spot. The variant has been adapted twice in the Soviet Union, as an animated cartoon in 1979 and as a stop motion cartoon in 1989.
 A 2014 movie, The Book of Life, directed by Jorge R. Gutiérrez, referenced the "candle scene" of the Grimm fairytale. A character known as the Candlemaker shows the other characters traveling through the underworld a room full of candles. He explains that the flickering candles, all of different heights, will go out when a person dies. He points to some that have just been snuffed, their smoke tendrils rising in the air.
 A Japanese traditional rakugo story "Shinigami" (established by the late 19th century) is actually based on Grimm's "Godfather Death".
 In the chapter 8 of his novel "Cat magic", Whitley Strieber tell his own reading of this story.

See also
 The Godfather (fairy tale)

References

External links

 
 Other tales of type ATU 332, "Godfather Death" by D. L. Ashliman

Godfather Death
Fiction about God
Fiction about personifications of death
The Devil in fairy tales
ATU 300-399